Jari is a municipality of the western part of the state of Rio Grande do Sul, Brazil. The population is 3,486 (2020 est.) in an area of 856.46 km². Its elevation is 441 m. It is located west of the state capital of Porto Alegre, northeast of Alegrete.

References

External links
http://www.citybrazil.com.br/rs/jari/ 

Municipalities in Rio Grande do Sul